Comin' in the Back Door is an album by American jazz pianist Wynton Kelly released on the Verve label featuring performances by Kelly with Paul Chambers and Jimmy Cobb with guitarist Kenny Burrell and an orchestra recorded in 1963.

Reception
The Allmusic review awarded the album 3 stars.

Track listing
 "If That's the Way You Want It" (Gloria Shayne) - 2:36  
 "Comin' in the Back Door" (Scott Turner) - 2:20  
 "Don't Wait Too Long" (Sunny Skylar) - 2:10  
 "Nocturne" (Claus Ogerman) - 2:40  
 "The Bitter End" (Ogerman) - 2:00  
 "Theme from "Burke's Law" (Herschel Burke Gilbert) - 2:10  
 "Quiet Village" (Les Baxter) - 3:09  
 "Caesar and Cleopatra Theme" (Alex North) - 3:10  
 "Signing Off" (Leonard Feather) - 2:27  
 "Little Tracy" (Wynton Kelly) - 2:39  
 "To Kill a Mockingbird" (Elmer Bernstein) - 2:15

Recorded in New York City on May 10, 1963 (tracks 7, 8 & 11), November 14, 1963 (tracks 4, 5 & 10) and November 15, 1963 (tracks 1-3, 6 & 9)

Personnel
Wynton Kelly - piano
Kenny Burrell - guitar (tracks 1, 3-6 & 8-11)
Paul Chambers - bass
Jimmy Cobb - drums
Claus Ogerman - string arrangement, conductor (tracks 1-3, 6-9 & 11)
Unknown musicians - cornet, clarinet, tenor saxophone (tracks 2 & 5) 
Unknown musician - vibes (tracks 8, 9 & 11)
Unknown musician - percussion (tracks 1, 7 & 8)  
Unknown musicians - trumpet, trombone, saxophones, conga, timpany, bell (track 11)
Bob Simpson, Phil Ramone - engineer
Val Valentin - director of engineering

References

1963 albums
Verve Records albums
Wynton Kelly albums
Albums arranged by Claus Ogerman
Albums conducted by Claus Ogerman
albums produced by Creed Taylor